So Delicious may refer to:

Music
 So Delicious (song), a 1979 single by Pockets
So Delicious, a 2015 album by The Reverend Peyton's Big Damn Band
It's So Delicious, a 1983 album by Starpoint

Other
So Delicious, a vegan dessert and beverage company owned by Danone North America